Robert Bowman (April 6, 1965) is an American swimming coach who is the current head coach of the Arizona State Sun Devils swimming and diving teams of Arizona State University.  Bowman is best known as the coach of 23-time Olympic gold medalist American swimmer Michael Phelps.  From 2005 to 2008, Bowman served as the head coach for the Michigan Wolverines swimming and diving team of the University of Michigan men's swimming & diving team.  From 2008 to 2015, he worked as the CEO and head coach for North Baltimore Aquatic Club.

In 2015, USA Swimming appointed him the head coach of the men's U.S. 2016 Olympic Team.

Personal life
Bowman was born and raised in Columbia, South Carolina where he attended Columbia High School.  He has a younger sister, Donna Bowman, who works at Chapin Middle School as a computer science professor.

Coaching career
In 1986–87, Bowman was a coach at the Area Tallahassee Aquatic Club and also served as an assistant coach at his alma mater, Florida State University.  Bowman swam for the Seminoles from 1983 to 1985, serving as a team captain in his final year.  Bowman graduated from Florida State with a bachelor of science degree in developmental psychology and a minor in music composition in 1987.  While at Florida State, Bowman was a member of the Pi Kappa Alpha fraternity.

Bowman held assistant coaching positions with the Napa Valley Swim Team (1991–92), the Cincinnati Pepsi Marlins (1990–91), and the Las Vegas Gold swim team (1988–90).

Bowman was also the head coach and program director for the Birmingham Swim League from 1992 to 1994.  While with the Birmingham Swim League, he was responsible for program design, staff development and daily operation of a 250-member club.  Under his supervision, BSL improved to a top five program regionally after finishing out of the top 20 the previous 10 years.

From 1994 to 1997, Bowman served as head coach for the Napa Valley Swim Team.

Prior to becoming the Men's head coach at Michigan, Bowman coached for nine years (1996–2004) at the North Baltimore Aquatic Club (NBAC) in Baltimore, Maryland.  From 1996 to 1999 he held the position of senior coach; and from 1999 to 2004 he was NBAC's High Performance Coach. During his tenure in Baltimore, Bowman helped to produce three individual national champions, ten national finalists and five U.S. National Team members. In recognition of his accomplishments, Bowman was named the USA's Coach of the Year in 2001 and 2003. He was also named Developmental Coach of the Year in 2002.

It was also during his work at NBAC that Bowman began coaching 23-time Olympic gold medalist Michael Phelps. Under Bowman's tutelage at the North Baltimore Aquatic club, Phelps won five World Championship gold medals and was named the American Swimmer of the Year from 2001 to 2004.

While at Michigan, Bowman worked closely with Greg Harden, then the sport administrator for swimming.  Harden spoke often with both Bowman and Phelps during their time in Ann Arbor leading up to the 2008 Olympics, and he often helped one communicate better with the other.  Bowman gives Harden some of the credit for all the success Team USA had in the pool in Beijing.  Bowman even says Harden was one of the major reasons he came to Michigan in the first place.  Bowman on Harden:  “He’s a miracle worker. He made me a better coach, and a better person.”

Bowman was named as an assistant coach on the 2004 U.S. Olympic Team, serving as the primary coach for Phelps.  At the 2004 Games, Bowman helped coach Phelps to eight medals, including six gold medals and two bronze. Four years later, at the 2008 Beijing Olympics, he coached Phelps to achieve eight Olympic gold medals, which had never been done before in a single Olympics.

In April 2008, Bowman announced that he would leave Michigan at the end of the 2008 USA Olympic Swim Trials (July 2008) and return to the North Baltimore Aquatic Club after the Beijing Olympics.

Bowman was added to the coaching roster to the 2012 London Olympics serving as an assistant coach for the 2012 U.S. Olympic Team.

Bowman was hired as the new swim coach at Arizona State University in 2015.

On September 9, 2015, USA Swimming announced that Bowman would serve as the head coach of the men's team for the 2016 U.S. Olympic Team.

In March 2023,  Bowman led the ASU Men’s swimming and diving team to its first PAC-12 Conference Championship in program history.

Books
 The Golden Rules: 10 Steps to World-Class Excellence in Your Life and Work. Bob Bowman, with Charles Butler (2016), St. Martin's Press.

References

External links

 

1964 births
Living people
American Olympic coaches
American swimming coaches
Florida State Seminoles men's swimmers
Michigan Wolverines swimming coaches
Arizona State Sun Devils swimming coaches
Sportspeople from Columbia, South Carolina